The 1951–52 Football League season was Birmingham City Football Club's 49th in the Football League and their 21st in the Second Division. They finished in third position in the 22-team division, missing out on promotion to Cardiff City on goal average. They entered the 1951–52 FA Cup at the third round proper and lost to Leyton Orient in the fourth.

Twenty-three players made at least one appearance in nationally organised first-team competition, and there were fourteen different goalscorers. Goalkeeper Gil Merrick played in 43 of the 44 games over the season. Of outfield players, full-back Ken Green played in 41. Tommy Briggs was top scorer with 19 goals, of which 18 came in the league.

Football League Second Division

Note that not all teams completed their playing season on the same day. Birmingham had been in the promotion positions since 22 March and were in second position after their last game of the season, on 26 April, but by the time the last game was played, on 3 May, Cardiff City had beaten Leeds United in their last game of the season to finish level on points with Birmingham with a better goal average.

League table (part)

FA Cup

Appearances and goals

Players with name struck through and marked  left the club during the playing season.

See also
Birmingham City F.C. seasons

References
General
 
 
 Source for match dates and results: 
 Source for lineups, appearances, goalscorers and attendances: Matthews (2010), Complete Record, pp. 338–39.
 Source for kit: "Birmingham City". Historical Football Kits. Retrieved 22 May 2018.

Specific

Birmingham City F.C. seasons
Birmingham City